El Tule may refer to:
El Árbol del Tule, largest girth tree in the world, in Santa María del Tule, Oaxaca, Mexico
El Tule, Chihuahua in El Tule Municipality, Chihuahua, Mexico
El Tule Municipality, Chihuahua, Mexico
El Tule, Zacatecas, Mexico
 El Tule a Latin group from Austin, TX